A list of rivers of Schleswig-Holstein, Germany:

A    
Aalbek, flowing through the Hemmelsdorfer See and into the Baltic Sea
Aalbek, tributary of the Stör
Alster
Alte Schwentine
Arlau

B
Barnitz
Basshornlaufgraben
Bekau
Beste
Bille
Bilsbek
Bilsener Bek
Bißnitz
Boize
Bölkau
Bondenau
Bramau
Bredenbek, tributary of the Alster
Bredenbek, tributary of the Bünzau
Broklandsau
Brokstedter Au
Buckener Au
Bünzau

C
Clever Au
Corbek
Curauer Au

D
Delvenau
Dosenbek
Düpenau

E
Ebach
Eider
Elbe

F
Fackenburger Landgraben
Flörkendorfer Mühlenau
Fuhlenau
Füsinger Au

G
Gieselau
Glinder Au
Godel
Gösebek
Gronau

H
Haaler Au
Hagener Au
Hanerau
Heidgraben, tributary of the Pinnau near Moorrege
Heidgraben, tributary of the Pinnau in Uetersen
Heilsau
Hohenfelder Mühlenau
Höllenau
Holstenau
Hornbeker Mühlenbach
Hudau
Husumer Mühlenau

J
Jarbek
Jevenau

K
Klosterdeichwetter
Kossau
Krambek
Krempau
Krückau
Krumbek

L
Lankau
Levensau
Lindenerau
Lottbek
Luhnau

M
Medebek
Meiereibach
Miele
Mitbek
Mühlenau, tributary of the Bekau
Mühlenau, tributary of the Pinnau
Mühlenbarbeker Au
Mühlenbek

N
Niederelbe
Norderbeste

O
Ohlau
Ohrtbrookgraben
Ostenau
Osterau, tributary of the Bramau
Osterau, tributary of the Broklandsau

P
Pinnau

R
Rantzau
Rellau
Rheider Au
Rhin

S
Salzau
Schirnau
Schmalfelder Au
Schwale
Schwartau
Schwarze Au
Schwentine
Sorge
Spöck
Stecknitz
Stegau
Stepenitz
Stör

T
Tarpenbek
Tensfelder Au
Tielenau
Trave
Treene

U
Unterelbe

W
Wakenitz
Wandse
Wedeler Au
Wehrau
Wierbek
Wilsterau

    

 
Schleswig-Holstein-related lists
Schleswig-Holstein